Victim – Who is next? is a 2022 Indian Tamil-language anthology thriller streaming series consisting of four short films directed by Chimbu Devan, M. Rajesh, Pa.Ranjith, and Venkat Prabhu. It is jointly produced by Venkat Prabhu and G. Dillibabu, under Black Ticket Company and Axess Film Factory. The film stars Nassar Thambi Ramaiah Priya Bavani shankar, Kalaiarasan, Guru Somasundaram, Prasanna and Amala Paul. The music was composed by Sam C S, Premgi, Ganesh Sekar, and Tenma. The cinematography was handled by Saravanan Ramasamy, Sakthi Saravanan, and Thamizh A. Azhagan. The editing was done by Lawrence Kishore, Akash Thomas, Selva R. K., and Venkat Raajen. The series consists of four stories. It premiered on 5 August 2022, exclusively, on SonyLIV.

Episodes

Cast

Production 
On 18 July 2022 Production House announces the trailer release date. 19 July 2022 SonyLiv release the trailer.

Reception 
Manoj Kumar R of The Indian Express wrote that "Pa.Ranjith's Dhammam is the pick of the lot". Srivatsan S. of The Hindu said that "Pa Ranjith excels with ‘Dhammam’, the rest peters out".

References

External links 
 

SonyLIV original programming
Tamil-language web series
Tamil-language anthology television series
Tamil-language thriller television series
2022 Tamil-language television series debuts
2022 Tamil-language television series endings